Carlos Méndez (born 27 June 1972) is a Puerto Rican judoka. He competed in the men's lightweight event at the 2000 Summer Olympics.

References

1972 births
Living people
Puerto Rican male judoka
Olympic judoka of Puerto Rico
Judoka at the 2000 Summer Olympics
Place of birth missing (living people)
Pan American Games medalists in judo
Pan American Games silver medalists for Puerto Rico
Judoka at the 1999 Pan American Games
Medalists at the 1999 Pan American Games
20th-century Puerto Rican people